John Hayward may refer to:

Politicians
John Hayward (MP for Bridport) (c. 1355–1407), MP for Bridport, 1373–1401
John Hayward (MP for Dorchester), MP for Dorchester, 1558
Sir John Hayward (historian) (c. 1560–1627), English historian and politician
John Hayward (MP for Bletchingley) (c. 1571–1631)
John Hayward (MP for Bridgnorth and Saltash) (c. 1591–1636), English politician
John Hayward (Massachusetts politician) (died 1672), member of the Great and General Court
John Hayward (Newfoundland politician) (1819–1885), Newfoundland politician and judge
John Hayward (British politician), Conservative Parliamentary candidate for Cambridge, 2017

Others
John Hayward (architect) (1808–1891), Exeter-based Gothic revival architect
Sir John Davy Hayward (1905–1965), English editor
Sir Jack Hayward (1923–2015), property developer
Jack Hayward (cricketer) (1910-1976), Rhodesian cricketer
Jack Hayward (political scientist) (1931–2017), English writer and academic
John T. Hayward (1908–1999), U.S. naval aviator and nuclear physicist
John Hayward (stained glass maker) (1929–2007), British stained glass artist
John William Hayward (1844–1913), Newfoundland artist and inventor
John Langford Hayward (1923–2013), British breast surgeon

See also
John Haywood (disambiguation)
John Heywood (disambiguation)